Saitobaru Kofun Cluster is a group of three hundred thirty three kofuns or tumuli in Saito city, Miyazaki Prefecture, Japan. This is one of the largest kofun groups in Japan, and the largest group in Kyushu situated on a 70-meter hill composed of diluvium. It is located within the Saitobaru-Sugiyasukyō Prefectural Natural Park.

General description
The Saitobaru kofungun or Burial Mounds were designated by the national government as a special historical site in 1952. The majority of the tumuli in Saitobaru have yet to be excavated and many remain wrapped in a veil of mystery. There are 311 elevated mounds, (31 keyhole-shaped mound (zenpo-koenfun (前方後円墳), unique to ancient Japan, 1 Houfun(方墳）, 279 circular type (empun (円墳)), kofuns) and 10 Yokoana (横穴) kofuns and 12 underground kofuns, the last being peculiar to southern Kyushu. The first scientific excavation was made in 1912. In 1952, Saito City Museum was founded, which was later changed to Miyazaki Prefectural Saitobaru Archaeological Museum.

Important Kofuns

Osahozuka and Mesahozuka
Osahozuka kofun is the Japan's largest hotatekai-shaped kofun, 175 meters long.
Mesahozuka kofun is a 180-meter-long zenpo-koenfun. Both belong to Emperor-related kofuns.

Himezuka Kofun
A 50-meter-long keyhole-shaped kofun, one of the most beautiful kofuns encircled by a moat and had precious treasures such as swords, vases, glass-balls inside. It was assumed to be built in the early 6th century.

Oninoiwaya Kofun
It was the only sideway kofun which was completely encircled by an earthwork (archaeology). This is unique and reminds one of kofuns in China.

See also
Kofun
List of Special Places of Scenic Beauty, Special Historic Sites and Special Natural Monuments
List of National Treasures of Japan (archaeological materials)
Cultural Properties of Japan#Buried Cultural Properties
History of Miyazaki Prefecture

References

External links
 Saitobaru Kofungun
 Saitobaru Kofungun
 National Treasure Database
 Japanese kofuns

Kofun
Buildings and structures in Miyazaki Prefecture
History of Miyazaki Prefecture
Special Historic Sites